Joseph Goodall (1760–1840) was an English cleric and Provost of Eton.

Life
He was born on 2 March 1760, in Westminster, the son of Joseph Goodall, and after attending Eton College he was elected to King's College, Cambridge in 1778. There he gained Browne's Medals in 1781 and 1782, and the Craven Scholarship in 1782. He graduated B.A. in 1783 and M.A. in 1786.

In 1783 Goodall became a Fellow of King's and assistant-master at Eton. In 1801 he was appointed headmaster of the school, which kept up its numbers and reputation under him. In 1808 he became canon of Windsor on the recommendation of his friend and schoolfellow Marquess Wellesley. In 1809 he succeeded Jonathan Davies as Provost of Eton.

Goodall's discipline was mild, but he is said to have been an insuperable obstacle to any innovations at Eton. In 1827 he accepted the rectory of West Ilsley, Berkshire, from the chapter of Windsor. He was also rector of Hitcham, Buckinghamshire, where Charles Goddard served as a curate. Goodall was one of those noted as a pluralist by John Wade, in his Extraordinary Black Book (1832).

Death and legacy
William IV once said "When Goodall goes I'll make [Keate] provost"; to which Goodall replied, "I could not think of 'going' before Your Majesty." He died on 25 March 1840, and was buried in the College Chapel on 2 April. A statue in the College Chapel was raised to his memory by a subscription headed by the Queen Dowager. He founded a scholarship of £50 a year, to be held at Oxford or Cambridge.

Works
Goodall wrote Latin verses, of which some are in the Musæ Etonenses (1817, i. 146, ii. 24, 58, 87). The second volume is dedicated to him.

References

Attribution

1760 births
1840 deaths
19th-century English Anglican priests
Provosts of Eton College
Fellows of King's College, Cambridge
Head Masters of Eton College
People educated at Eton College